Saxony (Upper Saxon: Saggsn), officially the Free State of Saxony (Upper Saxon: Freischdaad Saggsn), is a landlocked state of Germany, bordering the states of Brandenburg, Saxony-Anhalt, Thuringia, Bavaria, as well as the countries of Poland and the Czech Republic. Its capital is Dresden, and its largest city is Leipzig.

The term Saxony has been in use for more than a millennium. It was used for the medieval Duchy of Saxony, the Electorate of Saxony of the Holy Roman Empire, the Kingdom of Saxony, and twice for a republic. The first Free State of Saxony was established in 1918 as a constituent state of the Weimar Republic. After World War II, it was under Soviet occupation before it became part of the communist East Germany and was abolished by the government in 1952. Following German reunification, the Free State of Saxony was reconstituted with enlarged borders in 1990 and became one of the five new states of the Federal Republic of Germany.

The area of the modern state of Saxony should not be confused with Old Saxony, the area inhabited by Saxons. Old Saxony corresponds roughly to the modern German states of Lower Saxony, Saxony-Anhalt, and the Westphalian part of North Rhine-Westphalia.

History 

Saxony has a long history as a duchy, an electorate of the Holy Roman Empire (the Electorate of Saxony), and finally as a kingdom (the Kingdom of Saxony). In 1918, after Germany's defeat in World War I, its monarchy was overthrown and a republican form of government was established under the current name. The state was broken up into smaller units during communist rule (1949–1989), but was re-established on 3 October 1990 on the reunification of East and West Germany.

Prehistory 
In prehistoric times, the territory of present-day Saxony was the site of some of the largest of the ancient central European monumental temples, dating from the fifth century BC. Notable archaeological sites have been discovered in Dresden and the villages of Eythra and Zwenkau near Leipzig. The Germanic presence in the territory of today's Saxony is thought to have begun in the first century BC.

Parts of Saxony were possibly under the control of the Germanic King Marobod during the Roman era. By the late Roman period, several tribes known as the Saxons emerged, from which the subsequent state(s) draw their name.

Stem Duchy of Saxony

The first medieval Duchy of Saxony was a late Early Middle Ages "Carolingian stem duchy", which emerged around the start of the 8th century AD and grew to include the greater part of Northern Germany, what are now the modern German states of Bremen, Hamburg, Lower Saxony, North Rhine-Westphalia, Schleswig-Holstein and Saxony-Anhalt. Saxons converted to Christianity during this period, with Charlemagne outlawing pagan practices. This geographical region is unrelated to present-day Saxony but the name moved southwards due to certain historical events (see below).

The territory of the Free State of Saxony, called White Serbia was, since the 6th century, populated by Slavs before being conquered by Germans e.g. Saxons and Thuringii. It was not part of the old Saxon stem duchy. A legacy of this period is the Sorb population in Saxony. Eastern parts of present Saxony were ruled by Poland between 1002 and 1032 and by Bohemia since 1293.

Holy Roman Empire

The territory of the Free State of Saxony became part of the Holy Roman Empire by the 10th century, when the dukes of Saxony were also kings (or emperors) of the Holy Roman Empire, comprising the Ottonian, or Saxon, Dynasty. Around this time, the Billungs, a Saxon noble family, received extensive lands in Saxony. The emperor eventually gave them the title of dukes of Saxony. After Duke Magnus died in 1106, causing the extinction of the male line of Billungs, oversight of the duchy was given to Lothar of Supplinburg, who also became emperor for a short time.

The Margravate of Meissen was founded in 985 as a frontier march, that soon extended to the Kwisa (Queis) river to the east and as far as the Ore Mountains. In the process of Ostsiedlung, settlement of German farmers in the sparsely populated area was promoted.

In 1137, control of Saxony passed to the Guelph dynasty, descendants of Wulfhild Billung, eldest daughter of the last Billung duke, and the daughter of Lothar of Supplinburg. In 1180 large portions west of the Weser were ceded to the Bishops of Cologne, while some central parts between the Weser and the Elbe remained with the Guelphs, becoming later the Duchy of Brunswick-Lüneburg. The remaining eastern lands, together with the title of Duke of Saxony, passed to an Ascanian dynasty (descended from Eilika Billung, Wulfhild's younger sister) and were divided in 1260 into the two small states of Saxe-Lauenburg and Saxe-Wittenberg. The former state was also named Lower Saxony, the latter Upper Saxony, thence the later names of the two Imperial Circles Saxe-Lauenburg and Saxe-Wittenberg. Both claimed the Saxon electoral privilege for themselves, but the Golden Bull of 1356 accepted only Wittenberg's claim, with Lauenburg nevertheless continuing to maintain its claim. In 1422, when the Saxon electoral line of the Ascanians became extinct, the Ascanian Eric V of Saxe-Lauenburg tried to reunite the Saxon duchies.

However, Sigismund, King of the Romans, had already granted Margrave Frederick IV the Warlike of Meissen (House of Wettin) an expectancy of the Saxon electorate in order to remunerate his military support. On 1 August 1425 Sigismund enfeoffed the Wettinian Frederick as Prince-Elector of Saxony, despite the protests of Eric V. Thus the Saxon territories remained permanently separated.

The Electorate of Saxony was then merged with the much larger Wettinian Margraviate of Meissen; however, it used the higher-ranking title Electorate of Saxony and even the Ascanian coat-of-arms for the entire monarchy. Thus Saxony came to include Dresden and Meissen. Hence, the territory of the modern Free State of Saxony shares the name with the old Saxon stem duchy for historical and dynastic reasons rather than any significant ethnic, linguistic or cultural connection. In the 18th and 19th centuries Saxe-Lauenburg was colloquially called the Duchy of Lauenburg, which was held in a personal union by the Electorate of Hanover from the 18th century to the Napoleonic wars, and in a personal union with Denmark (along with neighbouring Holstein and Schleswig) for much the 19th century. In 1876 it was absorbed into Prussia as the Duchy of Lauenburg district of the Province of Schleswig-Holstein).

Foundation of the second Saxon state 

Saxe-Wittenberg, mostly in modern Saxony-Anhalt, became subject to the margravate of Meissen, ruled by the Wettin dynasty in 1423. This established a new and powerful state, occupying large portions of the present Free State of Saxony, Thuringia, Saxony-Anhalt and Bavaria (Coburg and its environs). Although the centre of this state was far to the southeast of the former Saxony, it came to be referred to as Upper Saxony and then simply Saxony, while the former Saxon territories in the north were now known as Lower Saxony (the modern term Niedersachsen deriving from this).

In 1485, Saxony was split in the Treaty of Leipzig. A collateral line of the Wettin princes received what later became Thuringia and founded several small states there (see Ernestine duchies). Since these princes were allowed to use the Saxon coat of arms, in many towns of Thuringia, the coat of arms can still be found on historical buildings.

The remaining Saxon state became still more powerful, also incorporating new territories and was known in the 18th century for its cultural achievements, although it was politically weaker than Prussia and Austria, states which oppressed Saxony from the north and south, respectively.

Between 1697 and 1763, the Electors of Saxony were also elected Kings of Poland in personal union.

In 1756, Saxony joined a coalition of Austria, France and Russia against Prussia. Frederick II of Prussia chose to attack preemptively and invaded Saxony in August 1756, precipitating the Third Silesian War (part of the Seven Years' War). The Prussians quickly defeated Saxony and incorporated the Saxon army into the Prussian army. At the end of the Seven Years' War, Saxony recovered its independence in the 1763 Treaty of Hubertusburg.

19th century

In 1806, French Emperor Napoleon abolished the Holy Roman Empire and established the Electorate of Saxony as a kingdom in exchange for military support. The Elector Frederick Augustus III accordingly became King Frederick Augustus I of Saxony. Frederick Augustus remained loyal to Napoleon during the wars that swept Europe in the following years; he was taken prisoner and his territories declared forfeit by the allies in 1813, after the defeat of Napoleon. Prussia intended the annexation of Saxony but the opposition of Austria, France, and the United Kingdom to this plan resulted in the restoration of Frederick Augustus to his throne at the Congress of Vienna although he was forced to cede the northern part of the kingdom to Prussia, which led to the loss of nearly 50% of the Saxon territory. Most of these lands were merged with the Duchy of Magdeburg, the Altmark and some smaller territories to become the Prussian Province of Saxony, a predecessor of the modern state of Saxony-Anhalt. Lower Lusatia and part of the former Saxe-Wittenberg territory became part of the Province of Brandenburg and the northeastern part of Upper Lusatia became part of the Province of Silesia. The rump Kingdom of Saxony had roughly the same extent as the present state, albeit slightly smaller.

Meanwhile, in 1815, the southern part of Saxony, now called the "State of Saxony" joined the German Confederation. The German Confederation should not be confused with the North German Confederation mentioned below. This southern Saxony shaped the territory of modern Saxony. In the politics of the Confederation, Saxony was overshadowed by Prussia. King Anthony of Saxony came to the throne of Saxony in 1827. Shortly thereafter, liberal pressures in Saxony mounted and broke out in revolt during 1830—a year of revolution in Europe. The revolution in Saxony resulted in a constitution for the State of Saxony that served as the basis for its government until 1918.

During the 1848–49 constitutionalist revolutions in Germany, Saxony became a hotbed of revolutionaries, with anarchists such as Mikhail Bakunin and democrats including Richard Wagner and Gottfried Semper taking part in the May Uprising in Dresden in 1849. (Scenes of Richard Wagner's participation in the May 1849 uprising in Dresden are depicted in the 1983 movie Wagner starring Richard Burton as Richard Wagner.) The May uprising in Dresden forced King Frederick Augustus II of Saxony to concede further reforms to the Saxon government.

In 1854 Frederick Augustus II's brother, King John of Saxony, succeeded to the throne. A scholar, King John translated Dante. King John followed a federalistic and pro-Austrian policy throughout the early 1860s until the outbreak of the Austro-Prussian War. During that war, Prussian troops overran Saxony without resistance and then invaded Austrian (today's Czech) Bohemia. After the war, Saxony was forced to pay an indemnity and to join the North German Confederation in 1867. Under the terms of the North German Confederation, Prussia took over control of the Saxon postal system, railroads, military and foreign affairs. In the Franco-Prussian War of 1870, Saxon troops fought together with Prussian and other German troops against France. In 1871, Saxony joined the newly formed German Empire.

20th century

After King Frederick Augustus III of Saxony abdicated on 13 November 1918, Saxony, remaining a constituent state of Germany (Weimar Republic), became the Free State of Saxony under a new constitution enacted on 1 November 1920. In October 1923 the federal government under Chancellor Gustav Stresemann overthrew the legally elected SPD-Communist coalition government of Saxony.

During the war, under the secret Nazi programme Aktion T4, an estimated 15,000 people suffering from mental and physical disabilities, as well as a number of concentration camp inmates, were murdered at Sonnenstein killing centre near Pirna. 

As World War II drew to its end, U.S. troops under General George Patton occupied the western part of Saxony in April 1945, while Soviet troops occupied the eastern part. That summer, the entire state was handed over to Soviet forces as agreed in the London Protocol of September 1944. Britain, the US, and the USSR then negotiated Germany's future at the Potsdam Conference. Under the Potsdam Agreement, all German territory East of the Oder-Neisse line was annexed by Poland and the Soviet Union, and, unlike in the aftermath of World War I, the annexing powers were allowed to expel the inhabitants. During the following three years, Poland and Czechoslovakia forcibly expelled German-speaking people from their territories, and some of these expellees came to Saxony. Only a small area of Saxony lying east of the Neisse River and centred around the town of Reichenau was annexed by Poland. Traditional close relations of Saxony with neighbouring German-speaking Egerland was thus completely destroyed, making the border of Saxony along the Ore Mountains a linguistic border.

Part of the former Prussian province of Lower Silesia lay west of the Oder-Neisse line and therefore was separated from the bulk of its former province; the Soviet Military Administration in Germany (SVAG) merged this territory into Saxony. This former Silesian territory broadly corresponded with the Upper Lusatian territory annexed by Prussia in 1815.

On 20 October 1946, SVAG organised elections for the Saxon state parliament, but many people were arbitrarily excluded from candidacy and suffrage, and the Soviet Union openly supported the Socialist Unity Party of Germany (SED). The new minister-president Rudolf Friedrichs (SED), had been a member of the SPD until April 1946. He met his Bavarian counterparts in the U.S. zone of occupation in October 1946 and May 1947, but died suddenly in mysterious circumstances the following month. He was succeeded by Max Seydewitz, a loyal follower of Joseph Stalin.

The German Democratic Republic (East Germany), including Saxony, was established in 1949 out of the Soviet zone of Occupied Germany, becoming a constitutionally socialist state, part of COMECON and the Warsaw Pact, under the leadership of the SED. In 1952 the government abolished the Free State of Saxony, and divided its territory into three : Leipzig, Dresden, and Karl-Marx-Stadt (formerly and currently Chemnitz). Areas around Hoyerswerda were also part of the Cottbus Bezirk.

The Free State of Saxony was reconstituted with slightly altered borders in 1990, following German reunification. Besides the formerly Silesian area of Saxony, which was mostly included in the territory of the new Saxony, the free state gained further areas north of Leipzig that had belonged to Saxony-Anhalt until 1952.

Geography

Topography

The highest mountain in Saxony is the Fichtelberg (1,215 m) in the Western Ore Mountains.

Rivers

There are numerous rivers in Saxony. The Elbe is the most dominant one. The Neisse defines the border between Saxony and Poland. Other rivers include the Mulde and the White Elster.

Largest cities and towns

The largest cities and towns in Saxony according to the 31 July 2022 estimate are listed below. Leipzig forms a conurbation with Halle, known as Ballungsraum Leipzig/Halle. The latter city is located just across the border of Saxony-Anhalt. Leipzig shares, for instance, an S-train system (known as S-Bahn Mitteldeutschland) and an airport with Halle.

Politics 

Saxony is a parliamentary democracy. A Minister President heads the government of Saxony. Michael Kretschmer has been Minister President since 13 December 2017.

2019 state election 

AfD received its highest share of the vote in any state or federal election, while the CDU and The Left both fell to record lows in Saxony. Under normal circumstances AfD should have received 39 seats in the Landtag; however, due to positions 31–61 being ruled invalid and removed from AfD's party list, they had no candidates to fill the final seat. Thus, it remains vacant and there are only 119 seats in the Landtag, one fewer than the standard minimum size.
The CDU formed a government coalition with the Greens and the SPD.

| colspan=13 align=center| 
|-
! rowspan=2 colspan=2| Party
! colspan=4| Constituency
! colspan=4| Party list
! rowspan=2| Totalseats
! rowspan=2| ±
! rowspan=2| Seats %
|-
! Votes
! % 
! ±
! Seats 
! Votes
! % 
! ±
! Seats 
|-
| bgcolor=| 
| align=left| Christian Democratic Union (CDU)
| 703,006
| 32.5
| 7.2
| 41
| 695,560
| 32.1
| 7.3
| 4
| 45
| 14
| 37.8
|-
| bgcolor=| 
| align=left| Alternative for Germany (AfD)
| 613,585
| 28.4
| 22.0
| 15
| 595,671
| 27.5
| 17.7
| 23
| 38
| 24
| 31.9
|-
| bgcolor=| 
| align=left| The Left (Die Linke)
| 265,871
| 12.3
| 8.7
| 1
| 224,354
| 10.4
| 8.5
| 13
| 14
| 13
| 11.8
|-
| bgcolor=| 
| align=left| Alliance 90/The Greens (Grüne)
| 192,489
| 8.9
| 2.6
| 3
| 187,015
| 8.6
| 2.9
| 9
| 12
| 4
| 10.1
|-
| bgcolor=| 
| align=left| Social Democratic Party (SPD)
| 166,920
| 7.7
| 5.5
| 0
| 167,289
| 7.7
| 4.6
| 10
| 10
| 8
| 8.4
|-
! colspan=13|
|-
| bgcolor=| 
| align=left| Free Democratic Party (FDP)
| 100,639
| 4.7
| 0.6
| 0
| 97,438
| 4.5
| 0.7
| 0
| 0
| ±0
| 0
|-
| bgcolor=| 
| align=left| Free Voters (FW)
| 98,353
| 4.6
| 2.6
| 0
| 72,897
| 3.4
| 1.8
| 0
| 0
| ±0
| 0
|-
| bgcolor=| 
| align=left| Die PARTEI (PARTEI)
| 12,557
| 0.6
| 0.4
| 0
| 33,618
| 1.6
| 0.9
| 0
| 0
| ±0
| 0
|-
| bgcolor=| 
| align=left| Human Environment Animal Protection (Tierschutz)
| –
| –
| 0.0
| –
| 33,476
| 1.5
| 0.4
| 0
| 0
| ±0
| 0
|-
| bgcolor=| 
| align=left| National Democratic Party (NPD)
| –
| –
| 0.0
| –
| 12,947
| 0.6
| 4.3
| 0
| 0
| ±0
| 0
|-
| bgcolor=black| 
| align=left| Partei für Gesundheitsforschung 
| –
| –
| New
| –
| 11,652
| 0.5
| New
| 0
| 0
| New
| 0
|-
| bgcolor=| 
| align=left| Blaue #TeamPetry Thüringen
| 1,508
| 0.1
| New
| 0
| 7,806
| 0.4
| New
| 0
| 0
| New
| 0
|-
| bgcolor=| 
| align=left| Pirate Party Germany (Piraten)
| –
| –
| 1.6
| –
| 6,632
| 0.3
| 0.8
| 0
| 0
| ±0
| 0
|-
| bgcolor=| 
| align=left| Ecological Democratic Party (ÖDP)
| –
| –
| 
| –
| 6,000
| 0.3
| 0.3
| 0
| 0
| ±0
| 0
|-
| bgcolor=#110077| 
| align=left| Party of Humanists (Humanisten)
| –
| –
| New
| –
| 4,305
| 0.2
| New
| 0
| 0
| New
| 0
|-
| 
| align=left| Dawn of German Patriots – Middle Germany (ADPM)
| –
| –
| New
| –
| 3,948
| 0.2
| New
| 0
| 0
| New
| 0
|-
| bgcolor=#005488| 
| align=left| Party of Reason (PDV)
| –
| –
| 
| –
| 2,268
| 0.1
| 0.1
| 0
| 0
| ±0
| 0
|-
| bgcolor=#FF0000| 
| align=left| Communist Party of Germany (KPD)
| –
| –
| 
| –
| 1,951
| 0.1
| 0.1
| 0
| 0
| ±0
| 0
|-
| 
| align=left| Bürgerrechtsbewegung Solidarität (BüSo)
| –
| –
| 0.4
| –
| 1,630
| 0.1
| 0.1
| 0
| 0
| ±0
| 0
|-
| bgcolor=| 
| align=left| Other
| 2,732
| 0.1
| 
| 0
| –
| –
| –
| –
| 0
| ±0
| 0
|-
! colspan=2| Valid votes
! 2,159,850
! 98.7
! 
! 
! 2,166,457
! 99.0
! 
! 
! 
! 
! 
|-
! colspan=2| Blank and invalid votes
! 28,636
! 1.3
! 
! 
! 22,029
! 1.0
! 
! 
! 
! 
! 
|-
! colspan=2| Total
! 2,188,486
! 100.0
! 
! 60
! 2,188,486
! 100.0
! 
! 59
! 119
! 7
! 
|-
! colspan=2| Electorate/voter turnout
! 3,288,643
! 66.5
!  17.4
! 
! 3,288,643
! 66.5
!  17.4
! 
! 
! 
! 
|-
| colspan=13| Source: Statistisches Landesamt des Freistaates Sachsen
|}

Members of the state government

Federal politics 
Saxony has 16 constituencies for the Bundestag.

Administration 
Saxony is divided into 10 districts:

  1. Bautzen (BZ)
  2. Erzgebirgskreis (ERZ)
  3. Görlitz (GR)
  4. Leipzig (L)
  5. Meissen (MEI) (Meissen)
  6. Mittelsachsen (FG)
  7. Nordsachsen (TDO)
  8. Sächsische Schweiz-Osterzgebirge (PIR)
  9. Vogtlandkreis (V)
10. Zwickau (Z)

In addition, three cities have the status of an urban district:
 Chemnitz (C)
 Dresden (DD)
 Leipzig (L)

Between 1990 and 2008, Saxony was divided into the three regions (Regierungsbezirke) of Chemnitz, Dresden, and Leipzig. After a reform in 2008, these regions –  with some alterations of their respective areas –  were called Direktionsbezirke.

Demographics

Population change 
Saxony is a densely populated state if compared with more rural German states such as Bavaria or Lower Saxony. However, the population has declined over time. The population of Saxony began declining in the 1950s due to emigration, a process which accelerated after the fall of the Berlin Wall in 1989. After bottoming out in 2013, the population has stabilized due to increased immigration and higher fertility rates. The cities of Leipzig, Dresden and Chemnitz, and the towns of Radebeul and Markkleeberg in their vicinity, have seen their populations increase since 2000. The following tables illustrate the foreign resident populations and the population of Saxony from 1816–2018:

Birthrate 

The average number of children per woman in Saxony was 1.60 in 2018, the fourth-highest rate of all German states. Within Saxony, the highest is the Bautzen district with 1.77, while Leipzig is the lowest with 1.49. Dresden's fertility rate of 1.58 is the highest of all German cities with more than 500,000 inhabitants.

Sorbian population 

Saxony is home to the Sorbs. There are currently between 45,000 and 60,000 Sorbs living in Saxony (Upper Lusatia region). Today's Sorb minority is the remainder of the Slavic population that settled throughout Saxony in the early Middle Ages and over time slowly assimilated into the German speaking society. Many geographic names in Saxony are of Sorbic origin (including the three largest cities Chemnitz, Dresden and Leipzig). The Sorbic language and culture are protected by special laws and cities and villages in eastern Saxony that are inhabited by a significant number of Sorbian inhabitants have bilingual street signs and administrative offices provide service in both, German and Sorbian. The Sorbs enjoy cultural self-administration which is exercised through the Domowina. Former Minister President Stanislaw Tillich is of Sorbian ancestry and has been the first leader of a German state from a national minority.

Religion 

As of 2011, 72.6% of people are not affiliated with any religion. The Evangelical Church in Germany represented the largest Christian denomination in the state, adhered to by 21.4% of the population. Members of the Roman Catholic Church formed a minority of 3.8%. About 0.9% of the Saxons belonged to an Evangelical free church (Evangelische Freikirche, i.e. various Protestants outside the EKD), 0.3% to Orthodox churches and 1% to other religious communities, while 72.6% did not belong to any public-law religious society. The Moravian Church (see above) still maintains its religious centre in Herrnhut and it is there where 'The Daily Watchwords' (Losungen) are selected each year which are in use in many churches worldwide. In particular in the larger cities, there are numerous smaller religious communities. The international Church of Jesus Christ of Latter-day Saints has a presence in the Freiberg Germany Temple which was the first of its kind in Germany, opened in 1985 even before its counterpart in Western Germany. It now also serves as a religious center for the church members in Poland, the Czech Republic, Slovakia, and Hungary. In Leipzig, there is a significant Buddhist community, which mainly caters to the population of Vietnamese origin, with one Buddhist temple built in 2008 and another one currently under construction. The Sikh faith also maintains a presence in Saxony's three largest cities with three (though small) Gurdwara.

Economy 
The Gross domestic product (GDP) of the state was 124.6 billion euros in 2018, accounting for 3.7% of German economic output. GDP per capita adjusted for purchasing power was 28,100 euros or 93% of the EU27 average in the same year. The GDP per employee was 85% of the EU average. The GDP per capita was the highest of the states of the former GDR. Saxony has a "very high" Human Development Index value of 0.930 (2018), which is at the same level as Denmark. Within Germany Saxony is ranked 9th.

Saxony has, after Saxony Anhalt, the most vibrant economy of the states of the former East Germany (GDR). Its economy grew by 1.9% in 2010. Nonetheless, unemployment remains above the German average. The eastern part of Germany, excluding Berlin, qualifies as an "Objective 1" development-region within the European Union, and was eligible to receive investment subsidies up to 30% until 2013. FutureSAX, a business plan competition and entrepreneurial support organisation, has been in operation since 2002.

Microchip-makers near Dresden have given the region the nickname "Silicon Saxony". The publishing and porcelain industries of the region are well known, although their contributions to the regional economy are no longer significant. Today, the automobile industry, machinery production, and services mainly contribute to the economic development of the region.

Saxony reported an average unemployment of 5.5% in 2019.

The Leipzig area, which until recently was among the regions with the highest unemployment rate, could benefit greatly from investments by Porsche and BMW. With the VW Phaeton factory in Dresden, and many parts suppliers, the automobile industry has again become one of the pillars of Saxon industry, as it was in the early 20th century. Zwickau is another major Volkswagen location. Freiberg, a former mining town, has emerged as a foremost location for solar technology. Dresden and some other regions of Saxony play a leading role in some areas of international biotechnology, such as electronic bioengineering. While these high-technology sectors do not yet offer a large number of jobs, they have stopped or even reversed the brain drain that was occurring until the early 2000s in many parts of Saxony. Regional universities have strengthened their positions by partnering with local industries. Glashütte is the birthplace of the German watchmaking industry and home to highly regarded watch manufacturers such as A. Lange & Söhne and Glashütte Original.

International trade 
Saxony is a strongly export-oriented economy. In 2018, exports amounted to 40.48 billion euros while imports stood at 24.41 billion euros. The largest export partner of Saxony is China with an amount of 6.72 billion euros, while the second largest export market are the United States with 3.59 billion. The largest exporting sectors are the automobile industry and mechanical engineering.

In April 2022, Saxony received about 84% of its imported oil and gas from Russia while nationally Germany only imported about one third from Russia. This is mainly due to the pipeline network, which since the time of the GDR has been strongly integrated with the Soviet Union, similar to other states of Eastern Europe.

Tourism 
Saxony is a renowned tourist destination in Germany. The cities of Dresden and Leipzig are two of Germany's most visited cities. Areas along the border with the Czech Republic, such as the Lusatian Mountains, Ore Mountains, Saxon Switzerland, and Vogtland, attract significant numbers of visitors. In addition, Saxony has well-preserved historic towns such as Görlitz, Bautzen, Freiberg, Pirna, Meissen and Stolpen as well as numerous castles and palaces. New tourist destinations are developing, notably in the Lusatian Lake District.

Education 
Saxony's school system belongs to the most excelling ones in Germany. It has been ranked first in the German school assessment (Bildungsmonitor) for several years.

Saxony has four large universities, six Fachhochschulen (Universities of Applied Sciences) and six art schools.

The Dresden University of Technology (TU Dresden), founded in 1828, is one of Germany's oldest universities. With 36,066 students as of 2010, it is the largest university in Saxony and one of the ten largest universities in Germany. It is a member of TU9, a consortium of nine leading German Institutes of Technology.

Leipzig University is one of the oldest universities in the world and the second-oldest university (by consecutive years of existence) in Germany, founded in 1409. Famous alumni include Leibniz, Goethe, Ranke, Nietzsche, Wagner, Cai Yuanpei, Angela Merkel, Raila Odinga, Tycho Brahe, and nine Nobel laureates are associated with this university.

With over 11,000 students, the Chemnitz University of Technology is the third largest university in Saxony.

Established in 1765, the Freiberg University of Mining and Technology, located in the former mining town of Freiberg, is the oldest university of mining and metallurgy in the world.

Saxony is home to several Max Planck Institutes and research institutions of the Fraunhofer Society.

One of the two main campuses of the German National Library is located in Leipzig.

Culture 

Saxony is part of Central Germany as a cultural area. As such, throughout German history it played an important role in shaping German culture.

Languages 

The most common patois spoken in Saxony are combined in the group of "Thuringian and Upper Saxon dialects". Due to the inexact use of the term "Saxon dialects" in colloquial language, the Upper Saxon attribute has been added to distinguish it from Old Saxon and Low Saxon. Other German dialects spoken in Saxony are the dialects of the Erzgebirge (Ore Mountains), which have been affected by Upper Saxon dialects, and the dialects of the Vogtland, which are more affected by the East Franconian languages.

Upper Sorbian (a West Slavic language) is spoken in the parts of Upper Lusatia that are inhabited by the Sorbian minority. The Germans in Upper Lusatia speak distinct dialects of their own (Lusatian dialects).

Motherland of the Reformation 
Saxony is often seen as the motherland of the Reformation. It was predominantly Lutheran Protestant from the Reformation until the late 20th century.

The Electoral Saxony, a predecessor of today's Saxony, was the original birthplace of the Reformation. The elector was Lutheran starting in 1525. The Lutheran church was organized through the late 1510s and the early 1520s. It was officially established in 1527 by John the Steadfast. Although some of the sites associated with Martin Luther also lie in the current state of Saxony-Anhalt (including Wittenberg, Eisleben and Mansfeld), today's Saxony is usually viewed as the formal successor to what used to be Luther's country back in the 16th century (i.e. the Electoral Saxony).

Martin Luther personally oversaw the Lutheran church in Saxony and shaped it consistently with his own views and ideas. The 16th, 17th and 18th centuries were heavily dominated by Lutheran orthodoxy. In addition, the Reformed faith made inroads with the so-called crypto Calvinists, but was strongly persecuted in an overwhelmingly Lutheran state. In the 17th century, Pietism became an important influence. In the 18th century, the Moravian Church was set up on Count von Zinzendorf's property at Herrnhut. From 1525, the rulers were traditionally Lutheran and widely acknowledged as defenders of the Protestant faith, although – beginning with Augustus II the Strong, who was required to convert to Roman Catholicism in 1697 in order to become King of Poland – its monarchs were exclusively Roman Catholic. That meant Augustus and the subsequent Electors of Saxony, who were Roman Catholic, ruled over a state with an almost entirely Protestant population.

In 1925, 90.3% of the Saxon population was Protestant, 3.6% was Roman Catholic, 0.4% was Jewish and 5.7% was placed in other religious categories.

After World War II, Saxony was incorporated into East Germany which pursued a policy of state atheism. After 45 years of Communist rule, the majority of the population has become unaffiliated. Nonetheless, even during this time Saxony remained an important place of religious dialogue and it was at Meissen where the agreement on mutual recognition between the German Evangelical Church and the Church of England was signed in 1988.

Sports

In 2020, there were 4,447 registered sports clubs of various disciplines with over 600,000 members in Saxony. The most popular sport in Saxony is football. With RB Leipzig there is one Saxon team playing in the Bundesliga as well as the European Champions League. Leipzig is notable for a longstanding football tradition, a Leipzig team having been the first national football champion in German history. Another popular sport is handball with SC DHfK Leipzig playing in the Bundesliga. On a local level sports such as table tennis, cycling, mountaineering and volleyball are popular.

Rock climbing

Saxony prides itself to have been one of the first places in the world where modern recreational rock climbing was developed. Falkenstein rock in the area of Bad Schandau is considered to be the place were the German rock climbing tradition started in 1864.

Winter sports
The Ore Mountains in southern Saxony are traditionally a region of winter sports. The ski ressort of Oberwiesenthal is the highest town of Germany, at an altitude of 900 m, though the surrounding mountains do not reach the same height as in the alpine areas of Southern Germany. Thus, climate change is posing a certain threat to the development of winter sports business. There are a number of training facilities for the German Winter Olympics' team in the region.

Art

The two major cultural centers of Saxony are Dresden and Leipzig. The two cities have each a unique character which is reflecting the role they played throughout Saxon and German history, Dresden being a political center while Leipzig has been a major trading city. Thus, Dresden is well known for the art collections of the former Saxon kings (Dresden State Art Collections with the Green Vault and Zwinger as the most well-known parts).

Leipzig on the other hand never had a royal court, so its culture is borne largely by its citizens. The city is famous for its relationship with classical music and names like Johann Sebastian Bach, Mendelssohn or Wagner are linked to it. Over the past decades the city became famous for its modern art scene, most notably the Neue Leipziger Schule (New Leipzig School) with artists such as Neo Rauch.

Porcelain
Saxony was the first place in Europe to develop and produce white porcelain, a luxury good until then imported only from China. The Meissen Porcelain manufactory has been producing porcelain since 1710. It is one of the world's leading porcelain manufacturers and one of the oldest and most internationally known German luxury brands.

Cuisine

Saxon cuisine encompasses regional cooking traditions of Saxony. In general the cuisine is very hearty and features many peculiarities of Mid-Germany such as a great variety of sauces which accompany the main dish and the fashion to serve potato dumplings (Klöße/Knödel) as a side dish instead of potatoes, pasta or rice. Also much freshwater fish is used in Saxon cuisine. The area around Dresden is home to the easternmost wine region in Germany (see: Saxony (wine region)).

Anthem
Saxony (as other German states) has its own anthem, dating back to the monarchy of the 19th century. 'Gott segne Sachsenland' (God save Saxony) is based on the melody of God save the King.

See also 

 Saxony (wine region)
 States of Germany

References

Bibliography

External links 

 Official governmental portal
 

 
States of the Weimar Republic
NUTS 1 statistical regions of the European Union
States and territories established in 1990
States of Germany